Giácomo Di Giorgi Zerillo (born 24 February 1981) is a Venezuelan footballer as a central midfielder. Di Giorgi can also operates as a playmaker, including as a defensive midfielder. He is of Italian descent, with Italians grandparents from both sides. He holds an Italian passport.

Honours

International
 Copa América (1): Fourth place 2011

References

External links
 Giácomo Di Giorgi at Football-Lineups
 
 

1981 births
Living people
Venezuelan footballers
Venezuela international footballers
Venezuela under-20 international footballers
2011 Copa América players
Venezuelan Primera División players
Estudiantes de Mérida players
Carabobo F.C. players
Llaneros de Guanare players
Deportivo Anzoátegui players
Deportivo Táchira F.C. players
Caracas FC players
Asociación Civil Deportivo Lara players
Association football midfielders
People from Acarigua